The 1979 Thunderbird Classic was a women's singles tennis tournament played on outdoor hard courts at the Arizona Biltmore Hotel in Phoenix, Arizona in the United States. The event was part of the AAA category of the 1979 Colgate Series. It was the ninth edition of the tournament and was held from October 10 through October 14, 1979. First-seeded Martina Navratilova successfully defended her 1978 title by winning the singles event and earned $20,000 first-prize money.

Winners

Singles
 Martina Navratilova defeated  Chris Evert 6–1, 6–3
It was Navratilova's 9th title of the year and the 33rd of her career.

Doubles
 Betty Stöve /  Wendy Turnbull defeated  Rosie Casals /  Chris Evert 6–4, 7–6(7–4)

Prize money

Notes

References

External links
 International Tennis Federation (ITF) tournament details
  Women's Tennis Association (WTA) tournament details

Thunderbird Classic
Thunderbird Classic
Thunderbird Classic
Thunderbird Classic
Tennis tournaments in Arizona